Autonomia Operaia (Italian: Workers' Autonomy) was an Italian leftist movement particularly active from 1976 to 1978. It took an important role in the autonomist movement in the 1970s, alongside earlier organisations such as Potere Operaio, created after May 1968, and Lotta Continua.

Beginning
The autonomist movement gathered itself around the free radio movement, such as Onda Rossa in Rome, Radio Alice in Bologna, Controradio in Firenze, Radio Sherwood in Padova, and other local radios, giving it a diffusion in the whole country. It also published several newspapers and magazines which were circulated nationally, above all Rosso in Milan, I Volsci in Rome, Autonomia in Padua and A/traverso in Bologna. It was a decentralized, localist network or "area" of movements, particularly strong in Rome, Milan, Padua and Bologna, but at its height in 1977 was also often present in small towns and villages where not even the Italian Communist Party (PCI) was present

There was also an armed tendency known as autonomia armata (armed autonomy).

People such as Oreste Scalzone, Franco Piperno, professor in Calabria University, Antonio Negri in Padova or Franco Berardi, aka Bifo, at Radio Alice were the movement's most well-known figures. The movement became particularly active in March 1977, after the police in Bologna killed Francesco Lo Russo, a member of Lotta Continua. This event gave rise to a series of demonstrations in various parts of Italy. Bologna University and Rome La Sapienza University  were occupied by students. On orders from Interior Minister Francesco Cossiga the carabinieri  surrounded Bologna's university area. This repression met with some international protest, in particular from French philosophers Michel Foucault,  Jean-Paul Sartre, Gilles Deleuze and Félix Guattari, who also denounced the Italian Communist Party's (PCI) opposition to the University occupation. The PCI was supporting at this time Eurocommunism and the historic compromise with the Christian Democrats.

The clash between the PCI and Autonomia
On 17 February 1977 Luciano Lama, secretary-general of the CGIL, the trade union closest to the PCI, gave a speech inside the occupied La Sapienza University. During the speech, the autonomi and the CGIL's security organization had a violent clash, that resulted in Lama being chased away. This confrontation prompted  the expulsion of the students by the police.

The clash between the PCI and Autonomia reinforced  the more radical current within Autonomia. The creative current, which included extravagant components, such as the Indiani Metropolitani movement, found themselves in a minority. Some of the autonomi decided that the time had come to alzare il livello dello scontro (escalate of the conflict), in other words, to start using firearms.

Autonomia and armed struggle 

Especially after the more effective prosecution, following the Moro Affair in early 1978, many autonomi went underground, reinforcing groups such as the Red Brigades, the Nuclei Armati Proletari (NAP) (a group active mainly in Naples prisons, where many autonomi members had been incarcerated), the Squadre Proletarie di Combattimento, the Proletari Armati per il Comunismo (PAC), Azione Rivoluzionaria, the Unità Comuniste Combattenti and Prima Linea, spread mainly throughout northern and central Italy. Also over 200 small, localised, armed groups were briefly active before suppression and/or amalgamation with the second generation of the much larger armed organizations, such as Red Brigades or Prima Linea (Front Line), between 1978 and 1982, a period in contemporary Italian history known as the "Years of Lead" (Anni di Piombo).

However, Autonomia Operaia was not related to and certainly did not direct the Red Brigades, as was claimed by the prosecution at the 7 April 1979 trial of Antonio Negri and other arrested intellectuals and activists involved in Autonomia Operaia and Potere Operaio during the 1970s. This fact was recognized by the Italian legal system when all charges of membership and direction of the Red Brigades were dropped on appeal. Nevertheless, the myth still persists today, mainly due to some unscrupulous journalism, that Autonomia Operaia and the Red Brigades were one and the same organization. Overall, it would be better to think of Autonomia Operaia as a decentralized network or archipelago of various types of very localized autonomist social movements and organizations, than one integrated social movement at the national level.

Following the increase and generalization of repression throughout the entire extra-parliamentary left during the early 1980s, when thousands of activists were imprisoned in carceri speciali (special prisons for terrorist and Mafia prisoners), most of the movement disbanded. At the beginning of the 1980s, a few of them entered Democrazia Proletaria, a far-left party which in the 1970s and 1980s ran for local, national and European elections, achieving however little success. Nevertheless, the movement began to revive in the second half of the 1980s, when occupied social centres (Italian: centri sociali occupati) started to become widespread in the main Italian cities. However, the new Autonomia is profoundly different from the Autonomia Operaia of the 1970s, although there is some continuity in both movement structures, especially the free radio stations and some long-term squatted social centres, such as the CSO Leoncavallo in Milan, and intellectuals, such as Toni Negri and Oreste Scalzone. They have recently returned from their flight in Paris and elsewhere during the 1980s and 1990s, along with some 200 other autonomists.

See also 
Autonomism
Years of lead (Italy)
Potere Operaio
Lotta Continua
Movement of 1977

External links  
Storia di Autonomia (History of Autonomia), Tactical Media Crew website, 1978 (in Italian)
Documenti politici (Political documents), Autonomia Operaia website (in Italian)
Convegno di fondazione di Autonomia Operaia, Autonomia Operaia founding convention, 3-4 March 1973 (in Italian)

References

1970s in Italy
Anarchism in Italy
Autonomism
Factions of the Years of Lead (Italy)
Left-wing militant groups in Italy